Manjula Gururaj is an Indian female playback singer and a voice-over artist who has primarily worked in Kannada cinema and also runs a music school.

Career

Playback singer
She entered the Kannada film industry as a playback singer in November 1983 for the Kannada movie Rowdi Raaja. She gained popularity for the song "Olage Seridhare Gundu" from the movie Nanjundi Kalyana.

Awards
 2019 - Kempegowda Award by BBMP.
 2010 - Karnataka Rajyotsava Award by the Government of Karnataka
 1993-94 - Karnataka State Film Award for Best Female Playback Singer for the song "Myale kavkonda mungara moda" from the movie Chinnari Mutha.

filmography

References

External links
 

Living people
Indian women playback singers
Film musicians from Karnataka
Indian voice actresses
Kannada playback singers
Singers from Mysore
Kannada people
Women musicians from Karnataka
20th-century Indian singers
20th-century Indian women singers
1959 births
Recipients of the Rajyotsava Award 2010